Delta Force: Urban Warfare is a first-person shooter by developer and publisher NovaLogic. It was designed to be a military simulation loosely based on the Delta Force special operations force. The storyline spans twelve missions, including a bank robbery, hostage rescue, and an assault on an offshore oil rig. It was re-released in 2010 on PlayStation Network for PlayStation 3 and PSP.

Reception

The game received "average" reviews according to video game review aggregator Metacritic.

References

External links
 
 

2002 video games
Delta Force (video game series)
First-person shooters
PlayStation (console) games
PlayStation Network games
Rebellion Developments games
Tactical shooter video games
Video games about Delta Force
Video games developed in the United Kingdom
Video games set in Colombia
Video games set in Germany
Video games set in Mexico
Video games set in Switzerland
Video games set in the United Kingdom
Video games set in Vancouver
Video games set in Venezuela
Video games with voxel graphics
NovaLogic games